Kamaanya Kadduwamala was Kabaka of the Kingdom of Buganda from 1814 until 1832. He was the twenty-eighth (28th) Kabaka of Buganda.

Claim to the throne
He was the eldest son of Kabaka Semakookiro Wasajja Nabbunga, Kabaka of Buganda, who reigned between 1797 and 1814. His mother was Abakyala Nansikombi Ndwadd'ewazibwa, the Kaddulubaale, of the Nseenene (Grasshopper) Clan. She was his father's first wife. His father married at least fifteen wives. He ascended to the throne upon the death of his father in 1814, assuming the name of Kamaanya. He established his capital at Nsujjumpolu.

Married life
Like his father, Kabaka Kamaanya had many wives. He is recorded to have married at least thirty eight (38) wives:

 Baakuyiira, daughter of Lule, of the Ngonge clan
 Basiima Mukooki, daughter of Kateesigwa, of the Nkima clan
 Gwowemukira
 Kayaga, daughter of Kiwaalabye, of the Kkobe clan
 Kisirisa, daughter of Walusimbi, of the Ffumbe clan
 Naabakyaala Saamanya, the Kaddulubaale, daughter of Walusimbi, of the Ffumbe clan. She was killed on the orders of her husband.
 Ky'osiby'omunyolo, daughter of Jjumba, of the Nkima clan
 Kyot'owadde, daughter of Kiyaga, of the Mamba clan
 Kyowol'otudde, daughter of Lutalo, of the Ndiga clan
 Lubadde, daughter of Majanja, of the Ngeye clan
 Mpozaaki, daughter of Kateesigwa, of the Nkima clan
 Mubyuwo?, daughter of Nakatanza, of the Lugave clan
 Muteezi, daughter of Nakato, of the Mbogo clan
 Mukwaano, daughter of Mugema, of the Nkima clan
 Nambi, daughter of Lutaaya, of the Ngonge clan
 Naabakyaala Nabikuku, the Kabejja, daughter of Jjumba, of the Nkima clan
 Nabirumbi, daughter of Kisuule of Busoga, of the Ngabi (Reedbuck) clan
 Nabiswaazi, daughter of Jjumba, of the Nkima clan
 Nabyonga, daughter of Mwamba?, of the Lugave clan
 Nabbowa, daughter of Kafumbirwango, of the Lugave clan
 Nakaddu, daughter of Kamyuuka, of the Kkobe clan
 Nakanyike, daughter of Senfuma, of the Mamba clan
 Nakkazi Kannyange, daughter of Ssambwa Katenda, of the Mamba clan
 Nakkazi, daughter of Lutalo, of the Mamba clan
 Nakku, daughter of Walusimbi, of the Ffumbe clan
 Nakyekoledde, daughter of Gabunga, of the Mamba clan
 Nalumansi, daughter of Walusimbi, of the Ffumbe clan
 Namale, daughter of Kiwalabye, of the Kkobe clan
 Namukasa, daughter of Nankere, of the Mamba clan
 Namawuba, daughter of Sempala, of the Ffumbe clan
 Nambi Tebasaanidde, daughter of Mugula, of the Mamba clan
 Namwenyagira, daughter of Kamyuuka, of the Kkobe clan
 Nannozi, daughter of Gomottoka, of the Nvubu clan
 Nankanja, daughter of Terwewalwa, of the Nvubu clan
 Nzaalambi, daughter of Natiigo, of the Lugave clan
 Siribatwaalira, of the Nkima clan
 Tebeemalizibwa, daughter of Mwamba?, of the Lugave clan
 Nanteza

Issue
He is recorded to have fathered sixty one (61) sons and several daughters. His son Suuna II, executed fifty eight (58) of his brothers during his reign. The children of Kabaka Kamaanya included:

 Prince (Omulangira) Kiggala I, whose mother was Baakuyiira
 Prince (Omulangira) Nakibinge Bawuunyakangu, whose mother was Saamanya. He was killed by being burned alive, on the orders of his father at Busonyi, Busujju County.
 Prince (Omulangira) Kimera, whose mother was Gwowemukira
 Prince (Omulangira) Ndawula, whose mother was Gwowemukira
 Prince (Omulangira) Lule, whose mother was Gwowemukira
 Prince (Omulangira) Kiggala II, whose mother was Gwowemukira
 Prince (Omulangira) Kitereera, whose mother was Gwowemukira
 Princess (Omumbejja) Babirye, whose mother was Kayaga. Twin with Princess Nakato
 Princess (Omumbejja) Nakato, whose mother was Kayaga. Twin with Princess Nakato
 Prince (Omulangira) Kaggwa, whose mother was Kisirisa
 Prince (Omulangira) Bagunyeenyamangu, whose mother was Saamanya
 Prince (Omulangira) Mbajjwe, whose mother was Ky'osiby'omunyolo).
 Prince (Omulangira) Bamweyana, whose mother was Kyootowadde
 Prince (Omulangira) Twaayise, whose mother was Mpozaaki
 Prince (Omulangira) Kyomubi, whose mother was Mukwaano
 Prince (Omulangira) Luwedde, whose mother was Nabiswaazi
 Prince (Omulangira) Kimera, whose mother was Nabbowa
 Prince (Omulangira) Lumansi, whose mother was Nakaddu
 Prince (Omulangira) Tebandeke, whose mother was Nakanyike
 Prince (Omulangira) Suuna Kalema Kansinjo, who succeeded as Kabaka Suuna II Kalema Kansinjo Mukaabya Ssekkyungwa Muteesa I Sewankambo Walugembe Mig'ekyaamye Lukeberwa Kyetutumula Magulunnyondo Lubambula Omutanda Sseggwanga, whose mother was Nakkazi Kannyange
 Prince (Omulangira) Wasajja, whose mother was Nakkazi. He escaped the slaughter of the princes by his brother, Suuna II.
 Prince (Omulangira) Ndawula, whose mother was Nakyekoledde
 Prince (Omulangira) Mutebi, whose mother was Nakyekoledde
 Prince (Omulangira) Mugogo, whose mother was Kyotowadde. He too, escaped the slaughter of the princes by his brother, Suuna II.
 Prince (Omulangira) Kigoye, whose mother was Namale
 Princess (Omumbejja) Ndagire I, whose mother was Namukasa
 Prince (Omulangira) Waswa, whose mother was Nambi Tebasaanidde. Twin with Babirye.
 Princess (Omumbejja) Babirye, whose mother was Nambi Tebasaanidde. Twin with Babirye
 Prince (Omulangira) Kajumba, whose mother was Nambi Tebasaanidde
 Princess (Omumbejja) Ndagire II, whose mother was Nannozi
 Prince (Omulangira) Kizza, whose mother was Nzaalambi
 Princess (Omumbejja) Tajuba, whose mother was Lubadde. She died after 1927.
 Princess (Omumbejja) Nassolo, whose mother Mubyuwo?
 Princess (Omumbejja) Nambi, whose mother was Muteezi
 Princess (Omumbejja) Nakayenga, whose mother was Kyowol'otudde
 Princess (Omumbejja) Namayanja, whose mother was Lubadde
 Princess (Omumbejja) Nabaloga, whose mother was Mpozaaki
 Princess (Omumbejja) Kagere, whose mother was Mubyuwo
 Princess (Omumbejja) Mwannyin'empologoma Nassolo, whose mother was Nabikuku
 Princess (Omumbejja) Nalumansi, whose mother was Nabirumbi
 Princess (Omumbejja) Nakku, whose mother was Nabyonga
 Princess (Omumbejja) Nakalema, whose mother was Nalumansi
 Princess (Omumbejja) Nakangu, whose mother was Nambi
 Princess (Omumbejja) Namika, whose mother was Nakaddu
 Princess (Omumbejja) Nakabiri, whose mother was Namwenyagira
 Princess (Omumbejja) Katalina Nabisubi Mpalikitenda Nakayenga, whose mother was Siribatwaalira. She was born around 1814. She died on 27 January 1907.
 Princess (Omumbejja) Lwantale, whose mother was Siribatwaalira. She was the Naalinnya to Kabaka Suuna II. She died in March 1881.
 Princess (Omumbejja) Nagaddya, whose mother was Tebeemalizibwa
 Princess (Omumbejja) Nassuuna Kyetenga, whose mother was Nankanja

His reign
Kabaka Kamaanya continued the wars of conquest against the Kingdom's neighbors which led to an expansion of the territory of the Buganda Kingdom. He conquered the ssaza, Buweekula, from Bunyoro and annexed it to Buganda.

The final years
Kabaka Kamaanya died at Lutengo in 1832. He was buried at Kasengejje, Busiro.

Quotes
It is claimed that Kamanya’s original name was Kanakulya Mukasa. But because he was such a tyrant, his contemporaries began to refer to a person of uncontrollable temper with a persecution mania (and indirectly to the king) as a kamanya.
 MM Semakula Kiwanuka, A History of Buganda, 1971

Succession table

See also
 Kabaka of Buganda

References

External links
List of the Kings of Buganda

Kabakas of Buganda
19th-century monarchs in Africa
1832 deaths
Year of birth unknown